Ro-21, originally named Submarine No. 39, was an Imperial Japanese Navy Kaichū-Type submarine of the Kaichū III subclass. She was commissioned in 1922 and operated in the waters of Japan. She was stricken in 1934.

Design and description
They displaced  surfaced and  submerged.

For surface running, the submarines were powered by two  Sulzer Mark II diesel engines, each driving one propeller shaft. When submerged each propeller was driven by a  electric motor. They could reach  on the surface and  underwater.

The submarines were armed with six  torpedo tubes, four internal tubes in the bow and two external tubes mounted on the upper deck, and carried a total of ten Type 44 torpedoes. They were also armed with a single  deck gun mounted aft of the conning tower.

Construction and commissioning

Ro-21 was laid down as Submarine No. 39 on 28 July 1919 by the Yokosuka Naval Arsenal at Yokosuka, Japan. Launched on 26 October 1920, she was completed and commissioned on 1 February 1922.

Service history

Upon commissioning, Submarine No. 39 was attached to the Yokosuka Naval District, to which she remained attached throughout her career. On 6 February 1922, she was assigned to Submarine Division 5 and to the Ominato Defense Division, and on 1 November 1924 she was renamed Ro-21. On 1 November 1925, Submarine Division 5 was reassigned to the Yokosuka Defense Division, then directly to the Yokosuka Naval District on 1 December 1926, and then to the Yokosuka Defense Division again on 10 January 1927.

Ro-21 was stricken from the Navy list on 1 April 1934. Her engines were removed at Uraga Shipyard, and on 6 July 1935 she was sold to the Fisheries Association of Miura District in Kanagawa Prefecture for use as an artificial reef. She subsequently was scuttled to serve as a breeding ground for fish and fishing reef.

Notes

References
, History of Pacific War Vol.17 I-Gō Submarines, Gakken (Japan), January 1998, 
Rekishi Gunzō, History of Pacific War Extra, "Perfect guide, The submarines of the Imperial Japanese Forces", Gakken (Japan), March 2005, 
The Maru Special, Japanese Naval Vessels No.43 Japanese Submarines III, Ushio Shobō (Japan), September 1980, Book code 68343-44
The Maru Special, Japanese Naval Vessels No.132 Japanese Submarines I "Revised edition", Ushio Shobō (Japan), February 1988, Book code 68344-36
The Maru Special, Japanese Naval Vessels No.133 Japanese Submarines II "Revised edition", Ushio Shobō (Japan), March 1988, Book code 68344-37
The Maru Special, Japanese Naval Vessels No.135 Japanese Submarines IV, Ushio Shobō (Japan), May 1988, Book code 68344-39

Ro-16-class submarines
Kaichū type submarines
Ships built by Yokosuka Naval Arsenal
1920 ships
Scuttled vessels
Shipwrecks of Japan
Maritime incidents in 1935